Bivar is a surname. Notable people with the surname include:

 Antônio Bivar (1939–2020), Brazilian writer and playwright
 David Bivar (1926–2015), British numismatist and archaeologist
 Luciano Bivar (born 1944), Brazilian politician and businessman